Diana Laitinen Carlsson (born 1972) is a Swedish politician. From September 2020 to September 2022, she served as Member of the Riksdag representing the constituency of Jönköping County.

References 

Living people
1972 births
Place of birth missing (living people)
21st-century Swedish women politicians
Members of the Riksdag from the Social Democrats
Members of the Riksdag 2018–2022
Women members of the Riksdag